Al-Mudhaibi Club (also known locally as Al-Annabi, or "The Maroon(s)" , or just plainly as Al-Mudhaibi) is an Omani sports club based in Al-Mudhaibi, Oman. The club is currently playing in Oman First Division League, first division of Oman Football Association. Their home ground is Sultan Qaboos Sports Complex. The stadium is government owned, but they also own their own personal stadium and sports equipment, as well as their own training facilities.

History
Al-Mudhaibi Club was founded on 3 October 1986 and registered on 26 June 2002. The club got promoted to Oman Second Division League in 2004 after they secured the second position in the 2003-04 Oman Second Division League.

Al-Mudhaibi is famous for producing some of the greatest and most successful Omani footballers including Ali Al-Habsi and Harib Al-Habsi and retired Omani internationals, Sultan Al-Touqi and Saif Al-Habsi. Ali Al-Habsi plays for Reading in the Football League Championship and is also the captain of Oman national football team. His brother, Harib Al-Habsi who too like Ali started his professional footballing career with Al-Mudhaibi Club has made one appearance for Oman national football team in a friendly match against Yemen Omani retired international Sultan Al-Touqi, former player of Al-Mudhaibi has had successful stints with various top clubs in the Middle East including Al-Qadisa SC, Al-Salmiya SC and Al-Shabab SC of Kuwait, Al-Shamal Sports Club of Qatar and Al-Shabab Club and Al-Suwaiq Club of Oman. Saif Al-Habsi, formerly known as the Maradona of the Gulf is a former Oman national football team player who has made appearances in the 1992 Gulf Cup of Nations, the 1994 Gulf Cup of Nations and the 1996 Gulf Cup of Nations which was held in Oman.

Being a multisport club
Although being mainly known for their football, Al-Mudhaibi Club like many other clubs in Oman, have not only football in their list, but also hockey, volleyball, handball, basketball, badminton and squash. They also have various youth football teams competing in Oman Olympic League, Oman Youth League (U-19) and Oman Youth League (U-17).

Crest and colours
Al-Mudhaibi Club have been known since establishment to wear a full maroon (with white stripes on the trim) or white (Away) (with maroon strips on the trim) kit. They have also had many different sponsorships over the years. As of now, Erreà provides them with kits.

Honours and achievements

National titles
Oman Second Division League (0): 
Runners-up 2003-04

Personnel

Technical staff

Management

References

External links
Al-Mudhaibi Club - SOCCERWAY
Al-Mudhaibi Club - GOALZZ.com
Al-Mudhaibi Club - KOOORA
Al-Mudhaibi Club - ofa.om

Football clubs in Oman
Oman Professional League
Association football clubs established in 1986
1986 establishments in Oman